Dan Michael Knudsen (born 2 March 1962) was the High Commissioner of the Faroe Islands (Rigsombudsmanden på Færøerne) until 2017. Knudsen was appointed to the office in 2008, succeeding Søren Christensen. He previously worked in the Department of Finance in the Faroese Home Rule Government, 1997–2000:

 2005–2007 Specialist consultant, the High Commissioner of the Faroe Islands
 2000–2005 Head of Section, the High Commissioner of the Faroe Islands
 1997–2000 Head of Section, the Faroese Home Rule Government, Department of Finance

As High Commissioner he drew up an annual report on the condition of Faroese society and reported to the Danish Prime Minister, whilst representing the Queen in the territory of the Faroe Islands

Personal
Knudsen graduated with a master's degree in Social Economics from University of Southern Denmark, Odense in 1997.

References

Sources
Information on the High Commissioner from the official Danish Prime Minister website.

1962 births
Living people
Faroese politicians
Faroese Lutherans
High Commissioners of the Faroe Islands
University of Southern Denmark alumni